Capistrano may refer to:

People
Saint John of Capistrano (San Giovanni da Capistrano, 1386–1456) was Franciscan friar, famous as a preacher, inquisitor, and crusader.
Capistrano de Abreu (1853–1927), a Brazilian historian

Places
Capestrano, Abruzzo, central Italy, the saint's birthplace
Capistrano, Calabria, a municipality in southern Italy
Capistrano, Ceará, a municipality in Brazil
San Juan Capistrano, California, a city
Mission San Juan Capistrano, a historic mission in California
Mission Basilica San Juan Capistrano, the present-day church and parish
Mission San Juan Capistrano (Texas)

Other
Warrior of Capestrano, statue found in the Abruzzo village
Capistrano (software), a software deployment script
USNS Mission Capistrano (T-AO-112), a WW2 oil tanker
When the Swallows Come Back to Capistrano, a song